State Highway 62 (RJ SH 62) is a State Highway in Rajasthan state of India that connects Bilara in Jodhpur district of Rajasthan with Pindwara in Sirohi district of Rajasthan. The total length of RJ SH 62 is 187 km. 

This highway connects NH 112 in Bilara to NH 62 and NH 27 in Pindwara. It also meets National Highway 14 in Sojat and Pindwara. Other cities and towns on this highway are: Sojat, Sojat Road, Sireeyari, Phulad, Jojawar, Bagol, Desuri, Ghanerao, Sadri, Lunawa, Sewari, Bijapur, Bera and Chamunderi.

See also
 List of State Highways in Rajasthan
 Roads in Pali district

References
 State Highway

Pali district
Transport in Jodhpur district
Sirohi district
State Highways in Rajasthan